"Temple of Love" is an electronica song performed by Swedish band BWO. The song was released as the first single from their second album, Halcyon Days in Sweden, on April 19, 2006.

BWO competed in the Swedish Melodifestivalen 2006 with Temple of Love, qualifying for the final at the Stockholm Globe Arena, where they finished second behind Carola. Temple of Love went on to reach Number 1 in the Swedish singles chart, and has been assessed as the most internationally successful Melodifestivalen song from the 2006 competition.

Track list
Digital download; CD single:
 Temple of Love (radio edit) 3:25
 Temple of Love (SoundFactory radio mix) 3:59
 Temple of Love (Brasco 80s mix) 3:55
 Temple of Love (Glam As You mix) 5:48

CD Single - The Club Mixes:
Temple of Love (radio edit) 03:25
Temple of Love (Organs Without Bodies remix) 05:18
Temple of Love (SoundFactory Reconstruction Anthem) 09:08
Temple of Love (SoundFactory Thumping Sex dub) 06:00
Temple of Love (Carl Ryden remix) 07:07
Temple of Love (Air Bureau remix) 08:58

Charts

Weekly charts

Year-end charts

References

2006 singles
BWO (band) songs
Songs written by Alexander Bard
Songs written by Martin Rolinski
Number-one singles in Sweden
Songs written by Anders Hansson (songwriter)
EMI Music Sweden singles
2006 songs